Ronald Winston Barnes (1 January 1941 – 13 December 2002) was a professional tennis player from Brazil who competed in the 1950s and 1960s.

Barnes reached the semifinals of the U.S. National Championships in 1963 (and the quarterfinals in 1967) and the quarterfinals of Roland Garros in 1964.

References

External links
 
 

Brazilian male tennis players
Sportspeople from Rio de Janeiro (city)
Tennis players at the 1963 Pan American Games
Pan American Games medalists in tennis
1941 births
2002 deaths
Pan American Games gold medalists for Brazil
Tennis players at the 1967 Pan American Games